Martin "Marty" Bergen (1869 – October 7, 1906) was an American National Champion jockey in Thoroughbred racing. As a result of his 1888 success in wintertime racing at the Guttenberg and Clifton Race Tracks in New Jersey, for 1889 Bergen was contracted to ride for the prominent stable of Samuel S. Brown. He would end the year as the United States number two jockey in total wins behind only Shelby Barnes and in 1890 he would win National riding honors.

Marty Bergen was the eldest of his brothers Joseph and Michael who were also jockeys. Joseph (Joe) Bergen died on January 6, 1893, as a result of a racing accident at the racecourse in Gloucester City, New Jersey.

On August 28, 1890, Marty Bergen rode Salvator in a "race against the clock" at Monmouth Park Racetrack in New Jersey in which he shattered the American record for a mile distance on dirt with a time of 1:35 1/2.

Marty Bergen died at age 37 from Consumption at a sanitarium in New York's Catskills. He left behind a wife and two children.

References

1869 births
1906 deaths
American jockeys
American Champion jockeys
Tuberculosis deaths in New York (state)
People from Onondaga County, New York
20th-century deaths from tuberculosis
Burials at Sleepy Hollow Cemetery